Jbita  is a Syrian village located in Wadi al-Uyun Nahiyah in Masyaf District, Hama. According to the Syria Central Bureau of Statistics (CBS), Jbita, Hama had a population of 687 in the 2004 census.

References 

Populated places in Masyaf District